Vince Fawcett (born ) is an English former professional rugby league footballer who played in the 1980s and 1990s.

Background
Vince Fawcett was born in Leeds, West Riding of Yorkshire, England.

Playing career
Fawcett struggled to fulfil his potential in a star-studded but underachieving Leeds side, but thrived in a big-fish-in-a-small-pond role at Workington Town in the 1994–95 season when Workington Town, back in the game's top division, secured a mid-table finish. Fawcett enjoyed an excellent season and scored three tries against his old side.

Fawcett's form alerted Parramatta Eels where he enjoyed a successful short stint in 1995 where he is best remembered for a match-winning performance against arch rivals Canterbury-Bankstown, as his two tries helped Parramatta register a shock win.

The big  returned to England with Oldham Bears in 1997, scoring only three tries, but they all came in the same game against Challenge Cup holders, St. Helens. Fawcett went on to play Super League for Warrington Wolves and Wakefield Trinity Wildcats.

International honours
Fawcett appeared for Great Britain at Under-21 level.

References

External links
Statistics at orl-heritagetrust.org.uk
Statistics at wolvesplayers.thisiswarrington.co.uk

1970 births
Living people
English rugby league players
Expatriate sportspeople in Australia
Leeds Rhinos players
Oldham R.L.F.C. players
Parramatta Eels players
People educated at Lawnswood School
Rugby league players from Leeds
Rugby league centres
Rugby league five-eighths
Rugby league locks
Rugby league wingers
Wakefield Trinity players
Warrington Wolves players
Workington Town players